Global City Square, also known as International Metropolitan Plaza (simply known as IMP), is a skyscraper in the Zhujiang New Town, Tianhe District of Guangzhou City, Guangdong Province, China.

See also
List of tallest buildings in China
List of tallest buildings in Guangzhou

References

Skyscraper office buildings in Guangzhou
Buildings and structures in Guangzhou

Buildings and structures completed in 2015
2015 establishments in China